USS Mugford may refer to the following ships of the United States Navy:

 , Wickes-class destroyer that was launched in 1918 and decommissioned in 1922
 , Bagley-class destroyer that was launched in 1937 and served until 1947, having served through World War II

United States Navy ship names